Patrick Osiako (born 15 November 1986, in Mombasa) is retired a Kenyan footballer who turned out for Coast Stars and Tusker in Kenya, Mjällby AIF, FC Linköping City, IFK Haninge, IFK Hässleholm and Syrianska Eskilstuna IF in Sweden, Petrolul Ploieşti in Romania, Hapoel Be'er Sheva in Israel, and Simurq in Azerbaijan as a midfielder.

Career
Osiako played for Coast Stars aged just 16 in the 2003–04 season before later crossing over to Tusker for a season and a half.

In December 2007, Osiako was signed by Superettan side Mjällby AIF on a two and a half-year contract. His contract with Mjällby expired at the end of the 2009 season; however, he signed a new two-year contract with Mjällby shortly after.

Following Osiako's release from Mjällby trained with Sölvesborgs whilst exploring options in Russia before having a trial with Romanian side Petrolul Ploiești. In March 2012, following a successful trial, Osiako signed a two-month contract with Petrolul Ploiești. After the expiration of his contract Osiako considered a new contract from Petrolul Ploiești before signing for Hapoel Be'er Sheva.

In August 2013, Osiako signed for Azerbaijan Premier League side Simurq from Hapoel Be'er Sheva. When Osiako made his debut for Simurq on 3 August 2013, coming on as an 87th-minute substitute for Stjepan Poljak in their 2–0 victory over Ravan Baku, he became only the second Kenyan to play in the Azerbaijan Premier League after Allan Wanga. Osiako scored his first goal for Simurq on 1 November 2013, in their 3–2 away defeat to Baku.

International career 
Osiako earned his first call up to the Kenya national football team in February 2005 while at Tusker then coached by Mohamed Kheri for a game against Botswana in a 2006 Nations Cup/World Cup qualifier.

A year and a half later under caretaker coach Tom Olaba, Osiako got his first international cap in a friendly game against Tanzania that ended in a 0–0 draw at the National Stadium in Dar es Salaam on 4 October 2006. Osiako went on to earn 13 National caps between 2006 and 2013.

Career statistics

Club

International

Statistics accurate as of match played 12 June 2013

Honours

Club
Mjällby AIF
Superettan (1): 2009

References

External links 
 Michezo Afrika – Michezo Afrika
 Patrick Osiako National Stats FoStats.com
 
 

1986 births
Living people
Kenyan footballers
Association football midfielders
Coast Stars F.C. players
Tusker F.C. players
Mjällby AIF players
FC Petrolul Ploiești players
FC Linköping City players
Hapoel Be'er Sheva F.C. players
Simurq PIK players
Kenyan Premier League players
Superettan players
Allsvenskan players
Liga I players
Israeli Premier League players
Azerbaijan Premier League players
Kenya international footballers
Kenyan expatriate footballers
Kenyan expatriate sportspeople in Sweden
Kenyan expatriate sportspeople in Romania
Kenyan expatriate sportspeople in Israel
Kenyan expatriate sportspeople in Azerbaijan
Expatriate footballers in Sweden
Expatriate footballers in Romania
Expatriate footballers in Israel
Expatriate footballers in Azerbaijan